Volvo Financial Services (VFS), established in 2001, offers financial services and solutions for Volvo Group's brands. VFS' global headquarters are located in Greensboro, North Carolina, USA. A global organization serving nearly 50 markets, VFS focuses exclusively on providing financial services and solutions to the Volvo Group's internal and external customers.

VFS offers its products under the labels of: Mack Financial Services, Renault Trucks Financial Services, SDLG Financial Services, and Volvo Financial Services.  Each line is designed to support one or more of the product brands offered by the Volvo Group.  The Volvo Group is one of the world's leading producers of vehicles and construction equipment.

Volvo Financial Services does not provide financing for Volvo Cars, which was sold to Ford Motor Company in 1999.

References

External links 
 Volvo Financial Services
 Volvo Group

Financial Services
Companies based in Gothenburg
Swedish companies established in 2001
Financial services companies of Sweden